Deerbrook Mall is a shopping mall in Deerfield, Illinois. Located on 47.45 acres, its anchor stores are Hobby Lobby, Jewel Osco, and Bed Bath & Beyond. Former anchors include Best Buy, Bally Total Fitness, Old Country Buffet, Blockbuster Video, GameStop, Office Max, Sports Authority, TJ Maxx, Venture, Wonder, The Great Indoors, and Art Van Furniture. The mall is located on Waukegan Road, north of the Edens Spur and south of Lake Cook Road.

History 
In 1970, 30 acres of land were purchased from Louis Werhane, a local farmer, with the plan to develop it into a mall. Primary construction was completed in 1971, with the mall's name being chosen by the winner of a drawing. The name is a combination of the two towns which the mall primarily serves: Deerfield and Northbrook.

Originally the internal theme of the mall was of a communal street scene with street lamps and water fountains featuring brass frogs and other sculptures of aquatic marine life. Sunken communal seating areas contributed to the small-town Main Street-like feel. The floor is mostly made of heavily lacquered-over red and brown bricks.

Venture, the now-defunct retail chain, was a ten-year tenant in the mall. Previous to Venture, the space housed a Turn Style store. Venture closed and vacated the space in January 1989. Other large retailers who vacated the mall, primarily as a result of the economic failure and reduction of the chains themselves, include Service Merchandise, Spiegel Outlet, John M. Smyth's Homemakers, and Montgomery Ward. Marshalls originally occupied the interior space,  hosting T.J. Maxx. Montgomery Ward also operated an auto repair and tire facility in a separate outbuilding immediately southeast of the main mall, built in 1986 and last occupied by Bally Total Fitness, and closed in the summer of 2012 the building was eventually torn down.    

Best Buy, which occupied the former Spiegel space, closed in 2012. The former Best Buy space became a Hobby Lobby in 2015. The former Service Merchandise space was later, briefly occupied by The Great Indoors, and then for three months  by a local children's superstore called Wonder!. In 2014, TJ Maxx, the last remaining tenant of the interior mall, announced that it would be relocating.

Deerbrook Mall formerly housed a four-screen General Cinema movie theater, which opened months after the mall's opening as a twin (a two-screen) during an expansion. Two auditoriums were added in the 1980s. The theater closed in 2001  amid the company's bankruptcy and never re-opened.

In 2017, the theater, store fronts, mall interior and Ulta Beauty were demolished to make way for new construction between Hobby Lobby, south and Art Van Furniture, north. Sports Authority had closed their store as part of the chain's bankruptcy in 2016. Art Van Furniture   opened Wednesday December 13, 2017, in the former Sports Authority location. Office Max closed on Saturday, December 16, 2017.

On March 5, 2020, it was announced that Art Van Furniture would be closing as Art Van prepares to file for Chapter 11 Bankruptcy and plans to close all locations.

1994 fire 
In May 1994, a fire broke out in the Bed, Bath, and Beyond store. 12 separate town's fire departments and the Northern Illinois Police Alarm System responded to the blaze, which began on the loading dock and spread to the interior of the store, damaging merchandise and the interior ceiling.

Renovation 
In 1998, Atlanta-based Lend Lease Real Estate Investments Inc. (Lendlease Group) acquired Deerbrook Mall on behalf of one of its public pension fund clients from Valenti Builders, a Northfield, Illinois based company. The new owners began a major interior and exterior renovation to update the aging mall which had been plagued by high vacancy rates. Subsequent major renovations between 2015 and 2017 included demolition of the enclosed portion of the mall in favor of major standalone anchor tenants.

References

Deerfield, Illinois
Shopping malls in Lake County, Illinois
Shopping malls established in 1971
1971 establishments in Illinois